"Cause I Have You" is a song written and recorded by American country artist Wynn Stewart. It was released as a single in 1967 and became a major hit the same year.

Background and release
Cause I Have You" was recorded on February 9, 1965 at the Capitol Recording Studio, located in Hollywood, California. The session was produced by Ken Nelson, Stewart's producer at Capitol Records. Four additional tracks were recorded during the same session, including the single "Sha-Marie." Stewart had recently signed with Capitol Records, after first being dropped by the label in the 1950s. He had first number one single on the label, "It's Such a Pretty World Today."

Cause I Have You" was released as a single on Capitol Records in June 1967. It was his fourth single release with the label. The single spent 16 weeks on the Billboard Hot Country Singles chart before becoming a top ten hit, peaking at number nine in September. Cause I Have You" was Stewart's third top ten hit single in his career and his fifth major hit altogether. Over the next several years, Stewart would have further major hits for Capitol Records.

Track listing
7" vinyl single
 Cause I Have You" – 2:32
 "That's the Only Way to Cry" – 2:24

Chart performance

References

1967 songs
1967 singles
Wynn Stewart songs
Song recordings produced by Ken Nelson (American record producer)
Songs written by Wynn Stewart